The 1990–91 season was the 86th season in the history of AJ Auxerre and the club's 11th consecutive season in the top flight of French football. In addition to the domestic league, Auxerre participated in this season's edition of the Coupe de France.

Competitions

Overall record

Division 1

League table

Results summary

Results by round

Matches

Coupe de France

References

AJ Auxerre seasons
Auxerre